Curt Fredén (born 1937) is a Swedish Quaternary geologist. Most of his work has centered on the Holocene geology of the Baltic Sea. He was a member of the landslide commission that existed from 1988 to 1996. In 2002 he was awarded the prize Geologist of the Year by Naturvetarna. He has been editor for Berg och jord, the geology volume of the Swedish National Atlas and worked on various geological maps of Quaternary deposits. Fredén was one of geologists who helped make the High Coast a World Heritage Site.

Fredén has notably contributed to advance the understanding of the "enigmatic" Ancylus Lake and to discard the controversial Sveafallen at Degerfors as the lake's outlet.

References

1937 births
Living people
Quaternary geologists
20th-century Swedish geologists
Uppsala University alumni
University of Gothenburg alumni
Geological Survey of Sweden personnel